Karai-Karai (Francophonic spelling: Karekare, Kerrikerri, Ajami: كاراي-كاراي) is a language spoken in West Africa, most prominently North eastern Nigeria. The number of speakers of Karai-Karai is estimated between 1,500,000 to 1,800,000 million, primarily spoken by the ethnic Karai-Karai people. It is an Afro-Asiatic language spoken principally in Nigeria with communities in Bauchi State, Yobe State, Gombe State and other parts of Nigeria. Many Karai-Karai words share a common origin with the Northwest Semitic languages of Hebrew and Arabic. Karai-Karai language is most closely related to the Ngamo and Bole languages (spoken in north eastern Nigeria) which are both considered derivatives of the Karai-Karai language.

Classification 
Karai-Karai is classified among the Bole-Tangale languages, together with Bure, Deno, Gero, Geruma, Galambu, Giiwo, Kubi, Maaka, Ɓeele, Daza, Pali, Ngamo, Bole and the isolate Tangale form the BoleTangale group of languages within the West Chadic branch of the Chadic family. In present-day Nigeria, it is estimated that there are over 2 million Karai-Karai primary and secondary language speakers within Nigeria, it is the second most widely spoken language in North eastearn Nigeria.

Bole-Tangale languages 

Below is a comprehensive list of Bole–Tangale languages names, populations, and locations from Blench (2019). It is the subgroup which the Karai-Karai language belongs

Literary Karai-Karai 
Standard Karai-Karai has its origin in the 1950s, when Northern Region Literary Agency (NORLA) worked on the book Ndar Ma Karatu which is the earliest publication in Karai-Karai published by Gaskiya Corporation.

References

West Chadic languages
Languages of Nigeria